Quest Pistols Show (before 2014, Quest Pistols) are a Ukrainian pop-rock band formed in 2007, originally consisting of Anton Savlepov (vocals, guitar), Nikita Goruk (vocals, bass), and Konstantin 'Kostya' Borovsky (vocals, keyboard). In 2012 Kostya left the band and was replaced by Daniel Joy. The band began as a group of dancers in a show called "Quest Ballet". On April 1, 2007 they took part as singers during the show "Chance" as an April Fools prank with the song "Я устал" and received over 60,000 positive votes. After their success, the group decided to become a band. Since their formation, the band has released the studio albums: Dlja tebja, in 2007 and Superklass in 2009; and one EP "Волшебные краски + ROCK’N'ROLL и кружева" in 2008, and now the single 'Forget Everything' in 2013 (later added to the album 'Shards of Ice'). This song marks the start of 'a new stage' of the band, completely different from the usual image. The press team commented; 'With this release, they start the next level in their musical career, it's changed not only the style of sound, but the pitch, perception, positioning, and also the choice of material.' Most recently, the band released 'Shards of Ice', which takes the band in a more electronic and synthpop direction.

In 2008 the band won the MTV Europe Music Awards 2008 as best Ukrainian Act of the year

In 2009 the band had been touring across Russia, Kazakhstan, Uzbekistan, Turkey, Belarus, Latvia, Estonia and Germany.

In 2009 Quest Pistols won MTV Europe Music Awards as the best band.

In January 2016, Anton Savlepov and Nikita Goruk left the band and joined former Quest Pistols member Konstantin Borovsky in a new band called Агонь.

Discography

Studio albums
 2007 - Dlja tebja (Для тебя, For you)
 2008 - Superklass
 2013 - Shards of Ice  - unreleased album
 2016 - Lyubimka  (Любимка, My dear)

EPs
 2008 - Volshebnyye kraski + ROCK’N'ROLL i kruzheva (Волшебные краски + ROCK’N'ROLL и кружева, Magic paints + ROCK'N'ROLL and lace)
 2015 - Sondtrack

Singles
 2008 - Volshebnyye Kraski (Волшебные Краски, Magic paints)
 2013 - Zabudem vse (Забудем все, Forget Everything)
 2015 - Mokraya (Мокрая, Wet) with MONATIK
 2016 - Nepokhozhiye (Непохожие, Unlike)
 2016 - Kruche vsekh (Круче всех, The coolest) feat. Open Kids
 2018 - Ub'yu (Убью, I'll kill) feat. Constantine [Video Version]

Songs not included in albums
 2009 - YA tvoy narkotik (Я твой наркотик, I'm your drug)
 2009 - Revolyutsiya (Революция, Revolution)
 2011 - Ty tak krasiva (Ты так красива, You're so beautiful)
 2011 - Zharkiye tantsy (Жаркие танцы, Hot Dancing)
 2011 - Ty Pokhudela (Ты Похудела, You lost weight)
 2012 - Utomlennoye solntse (Утомленное солнце, The tired sun) feat. Lena Katina from t.A.T.u.
 2015 - Vso pakhnet toboy (Всё пахнет тобой, Everything smells of you)
 2017 - Ukh ty kakoy! (Ух ты какой!, Oh man!) feat. Меджикул
 2018 - Pey voda (Пей вода, Drink water) feat. DJ Fenix

Videography

DVDs
 2008 - Party

Music videos

References

External links
Official site

Ukrainian rock music groups
Ukrainian pop music groups